Jagdish Lad (1987 – 30 April 2021) was an Indian bodybuilder. He had represented India and Maharashtra at several bodybuilding competitions.

Biography 
Jagdish Lad was born and raised in Kundal village in the district of Sangli. He later moved to Navi Mumbai. However, he subsequently settled in Ahmedabad in order to manage a local gym.

Career 
Lad claimed a silver medal in the men's category of up to 90 kg during the 2014 & 2015 WBPF World Championship which was held in Mumbai,Bangkok. He also claimed a silver medal at Mr. India bodybuilding competition and also won the national Bharat Shri title. He retired from professional bodybuilding in 2018.

Death 
Lad died on 30 April 2021, from COVID-19 at the age of 34. He was kept under oxygen support at a private hospital in Ahmedabad. He was also the second competitive Indian bodybuilder to die due to COVID-19 after Manoj Lakhan, a 30–32 year old who died the previous week. It was revealed that Jagdish faced financial issues during the lockdown imposed due to the COVID-19 pandemic in India.

References 

1987 births
2021 deaths
Professional bodybuilders
Indian bodybuilders
People from Sangli
Deaths from the COVID-19 pandemic in India